Count  was a Japanese diplomat.

Diplomatic career
He was born January 19, 1857, in Hirosaki, Aomori.

In 1877 he went to study at DePauw University. He got his B.A. in 1881, and M.A. in 1884. In 1882 he married, and had one son.

From 1890 to 1894, Chinda served as Japanese Consul in San Francisco, California. In 1897 Chinda was appointed first Japanese Minister Plenipotentiary to Brazil, following the establishment of diplomatic relations between the two states in 1895. He served as Japanese Ambassador to Germany from 1908 to 1911, to the United States from 1912 to 1916 and to the United Kingdom from 1916 to 1920, during which time he also took part in the Japanese delegation to the Paris Peace Conference, 1919. He was part of the Commission on Colonial Mandates, which drafted a mandates system that would subject of approval by the League of Nations members.

He was also a Methodist minister.

Ambassador Chinda Sutemi and his wife Japanese Viscountess Chinda Iwa were two of the diplomats involved with the Japanese gifting of the cherry blossom trees to Washington, D.C. in 1912. As official representatives of Japan, Ambassador Sutemi Chinda and his wife, Japanese Viscountess Iwa Chinda, joined with President Taft's wife, First Lady Helen Herron Taft on March 27, 1912. Each woman planted one of the recently arrived Yoshino cherry trees in the nation's capital onto the northern bank of the then empty landscape around the Washington, D.C. Tidal Basin, about 125 feet south of what is now Independence Avenue, SW. At the conclusion of the ceremony, the first lady presented a bouquet of "American Beauty" roses to Viscountess Chinda. Washington's renowned National Cherry Blossom Festival grew from this simple ceremony, witnessed by just a few persons. These two original trees still stand several hundred yards west of the John Paul Jones Memorial, located at the terminus of 17th Street, SW. Situated near the bases of the trees is a large bronze plaque which commemorates the occasion. This gift was officially seen as coming from the capital city of Japan, Tokyo, to the capital city of the United States, Washington, D.C. The illustrated biography The Art of Peace presents Prince Iyesato Tokugawa and his Japanese allies' pivotal involvement in bringing about the gifting of these cherry blossom trees as a means of promoting international goodwill.

In 1915, while Count Chinda Sutemi was the Japanese Ambassador to the United States he greeted the visiting Japanese statesmen Baron Eiichi Shibusawa when Shibusawa visited New York City. The 1915 photo illustration to the right presents Chinda at the event honoring the visit of Baron Shibusawa which was attended by two former U.S. Presidents Theodore Roosevelt and William Howard Taft.

Honours
From the Japanese Wikipedia article

Titles
Baron (21 September 1907)
Viscount (24 August 1911)
Count (7 September 1920)

Decorations (Japanese)
Grand Cordon of the Order of the Sacred Treasure (1 April 1906; Third Class: 5 March 1902; Fourth Class: 28 June 1898; Fifth Class: 31 October 1895)
Grand Cordon of the Order of the Rising Sun (14 September 1907)
Grand Cordon of the Order of the Rising Sun with Paulownia Flowers (7 September 1920)

Court order of precedence
Seventh rank (27 November 1886)
Sixth rank (21 December 1891)
Senior sixth rank (20 September 1895)
Senior fifth rank (20 August 1897)
Fourth rank (31 January 1901)
Senior fourth rank (20 March 1906)
Third rank (30 April 1909)
Senior third rank (11 May 1914)
Second rank (30 May 1921)
Senior second rank (1 June 1928)
First rank (16 January 1929)

See also
 List of Japanese ministers, envoys and ambassadors to Germany

References

Further reading

  "Japanese Envoy Dines Woodford; Baron Chinda Entertains Him with Other Americans in Kaiser's Capital," The New York Times, January 30, 1910 
  "Chinda Loses Ruler's Gift; Japanese Ambassador Left Cigarette Case on Banquet Table," The New York Times, June 9, 1913

1857 births
1929 deaths
Kazoku
DePauw University alumni
Ambassadors of Japan to the United States
Ambassadors of Japan to the United Kingdom
Ambassadors of Japan to Germany
Ambassadors of Japan to Brazil
Japanese Methodists
Recipients of the Order of the Rising Sun
Knights Grand Cross of the Order of Pope Pius IX
20th-century diplomats
Honorary Knights Grand Cross of the Order of the British Empire
Honorary Knights Grand Cross of the Royal Victorian Order